This is a list of every starting quarterback for the New England Patriots, a professional American football team who compete in the National Football League (NFL).

There have been 28 starting quarterbacks for the Patriots since their founding in 1960. Babe Parilli was the franchise's first longtime starter, leading the Patriots to their only playoff berth and championship game appearance while a member of the American Football League (AFL). Following the AFL–NFL merger in 1970, Jim Plunkett was drafted by the Patriots first overall to become the starting quarterback, but an unsuccessful tenure resulted in him being traded after five seasons. Plunkett was succeeded by Steve Grogan, who served as the team's primary starter during the late 1970s and helped lead them to their first NFL playoff appearances. A series of injuries caused Grogan to lose his starting job by the 1980s, although he remained on the team until 1990. The Patriots lacked a steady quarterback for most of the 1980s, with five (including Grogan) starting in the 1987 season. First-round selection Tony Eason, the longest-tenured of the decade, contributed to the Patriots making their Super Bowl debut, but lasted only three seasons as the primary starter.

In the 1990s, first overall pick Drew Bledsoe ended the Patriots' search for a quarterback by bringing the team to consistent playoff contention after five losing seasons. Bledsoe's success would be eclipsed the next decade when an injury caused him to be relieved by backup Tom Brady. As the franchise's longest-tenured quarterback from 2001 to 2019, Brady is credited with the Patriots dynasty that saw them set the records for Super Bowl appearances and wins. 
The Patriots' 2021 and 2022 starting quarterback is Mac Jones, who was named the starter at the beginning of his rookie season in 2021.  However, due to injury early in the 2022 season (high ankle sprain) Bailey Zappe, a rookie, was named the starter.

History
Butch Songin became the first starting quarterback for the Patriots in 1960, when the franchise was first established. He started the first 12 games of the season, and Tom Greene replaced him as starting quarterback for the final two games. Babe Parilli was the next starting quarterback for the Patriots, from 1961 to 1967.

In 1971, when the team moved to Foxborough and renamed from the "Boston Patriots" to the "New England Patriots", Jim Plunkett took over as quarterback. Plunkett started every regular season game for four straight seasons, until he was replaced by Steve Grogan as the starting quarterback in the 1975 season. Grogan was the only starting quarterback for six straight seasons, until Matt Cavanaugh started for four of the sixteen games in 1980. Grogan continued to start for the Patriots for parts of seasons until his retirement in 1990. Grogan finished his career with 135 games as starting quarterback, the second-most of any Patriots starting quarterback ever.

From 1987 until 1993, the Patriots had no regular starting quarterback, with as many as five in one season, until Drew Bledsoe was drafted as the number one overall pick in the 1993 NFL Draft. Bledsoe led the team to four playoff appearances (1994, 1996, 1997, and 1998), two AFC East championships (1996 and 1997), and an AFC Championship (1997). Bledsoe was the team's primary starting quarterback for eight straight seasons until a hit by New York Jets linebacker Mo Lewis sheared a blood vessel in his chest, which put Bledsoe out for the rest of the 2001 season. Before the start of the 2002 season, Bledsoe was traded to the Buffalo Bills and did not get to see the opening of the new Gillette Stadium in September 2002.

Tom Brady has led the team for more regular season games (267), postseason games (40), Super Bowl appearances (9), and complete seasons (15) than any other quarterback in franchise history. Brady's only incomplete seasons were 2001, when he replaced Bledsoe as the starting quarterback, 2008, when he suffered a season-ending knee injury in the first game of the regular season, and 2016 when he was suspended by the NFL for the first four games of the season as a result of the Deflategate incident. In 2008, Matt Cassel started the remaining 15 games, and despite missing the playoffs, the team finished with an 11–5 record and second place in the AFC East. In 2016, Jimmy Garoppolo served as the starting quarterback for the first two games of the season in Brady's absence before Garoppolo was injured and replaced by Jacoby Brissett. Brady also has led the team to all six of the franchise's Super Bowl victories, doing so in 2001, 2003, 2004,  2014, 2016 and 2018. He is one of only four Patriots quarterbacks to have started at Gillette Stadium, the others having been Cassel, Garoppolo, and Brissett. Steve Grogan has started the second-most games in franchise history (135), 116 games fewer than Brady.

Starting quarterbacks

Regular season

Postseason

Statistics
Having been the starting quarterback 20 seasons, Tom Brady holds the record for the most starts and wins with the Patriots. He is also the franchise leader in attempts, completions, total yards gained, and passing touchdowns, although Jimmy Garoppolo has the best pass completion percentage. Brady also holds the record for the longest completed pass by a Patriots starting quarterback, throwing a 99-yard touchdown pass to wide receiver Wes Welker in an away game against the Miami Dolphins during the 2011 season.

Brady is also the leader in rushing attempts, but Steve Grogan has the most rushing yards and rushing touchdowns. Tom Yewcic holds the record for the longest rush with a 46-yard run in the Patriots' 14–10 road loss to the Denver Broncos during the 1963 season.

* Statistics accurate through the 2022 NFL season
Italic text indicates that the player is currently on the Patriots roster

See also
 Lists of NFL starting quarterbacks
 List of New England Patriots first-round draft picks
 History of the New England Patriots

Notes
 In each game, a team picks one player to start in the quarterback position. Players may be substituted during the game, but the term "starting quarterback" refers to the player who started the game in that position.
 Since the 1978 NFL season, all teams have played 16-game schedules.
 Strikes by the National Football League Players Association in the 1982 and 1987 seasons resulted in shortened seasons (9- and 15-game schedules, respectively).

References
General

Specific

New England Patriots

quarterbacks